Ricardo Hocevar and André Miele were the defending champions, however Miele chose not to compete this year.
Hocevar partnered up with Guillermo Olaso. They withdrew before their semifinal match against Martin Emmrich and Andreas Siljeström.
Ryler DeHeart and Pierre-Ludovic Duclos won in the final 6–4, 7–5 against Emmrich and Siljeström.

Seeds

Draw

Draw

References
 Doubles Draw

Manta Open - Doubles
Manta Open